"Alright with Me" is a song by British rapper Wretch 32, featuring vocals from English singer Anne-Marie and Welsh singer Prgrshn. It was released as a digital download in the United Kingdom on 11 December 2015 through Ministry of Sound. The song was written by Emeli Sandé and Wretch 32.

Music video
A music video to accompany the release of "Alright with Me" was first released onto YouTube on 12 November 2015 at a total length of three minutes and twenty-five seconds.

Track listing

Charts

Release history

References

2015 songs
2015 singles
Wretch 32 songs
Ministry of Sound singles
Anne-Marie (singer) songs
Songs written by Emeli Sandé
Songs written by Wretch 32